Qeshlaq-e Zaviyeh (also Romanized as Qeshlāq-e Zāvīyeh; also known as Zāvīyeh Qeshlāq (Persian: زاويه قشلاق)) is a village in Angut-e Gharbi Rural District, Anguti District, Germi County, Ardabil Province, Iran. At the 2006 census, its population was 69, in 16 families.

References 

Towns and villages in Germi County